Harris v Goddard [1983] 3 All ER 242 is an English land law and matrimonial law case, concerning co-owned land between spouses and finding as to the effect of a divorce petition.

Facts
Mr Harris and Mrs Harris, joint tenants, fell out, she petitioned for divorce and asked under the Matrimonial Causes Act 1973, ‘That such order may be made by way of transfer of property and/or settlement in respect of the former matrimonial home… and otherwise as may be just’. Mr Harris was killed in an accident, before the divorce hearing. The issue was whether a divorce petition effectively severs the joint tenancy.  If so, she will have acted against her own interests, as the property falls to be divided in accordance with the Will (subject to the legal matrix of rights for dependant widows) as her husband quickly died.

Judgment
Lawton LJ held that the petition was not effective to sever, because this was expressed so as to bring about the severance at some point in the future. His judgment continued.

Dillon LJ said the following.

Significance

The underlying law as to survivorship and the default way in which spouses co-own (as joint tenants in equity, not tenants in common in equity) has not changed - it takes documented 'words of severance' to end the survivor's full-parts ("absolute") inheritance of a jointly owned asset (which is the resultant feature of being a 'joint tenant in equity').

English family law common process in divorce (replicated at this stage in separation) has increased the likelihood of the reflection of the end of the relationship affecting the financial affairs of the parties.  Under the Family Law Act 1996 a spouse or other cohabitant with shared children will commonly register their interests as part of any separation or divorce while also severing the joint tenancy.  This means any third parties interested in the other spouse's property alone (for example) are fixed with actual notice of the rights of the spouse and that those rights are solidified.  Equity itself has shifted in favour of equal division further than in 1983, with extra considerable sums likely for children.

See also

English trusts law
English property law

References

Notes

1983 in England
1983 in case law
English land case law
1983 in British law
Court of Appeal (England and Wales) cases